Losing All is the third studio album from rock band Day of Fire, released on January 26, 2010.

Track listing

Personnel
Joshua Brown - vocals
Joe Pangallo - guitar
Chris Pangallo - bass
Zach Simms - drums

References

2010 albums
Day of Fire albums
Razor & Tie albums